Geraldton Christian College (previously Strathablyn Christian College) is a Christian college located in Geraldton, Western Australia.

External links
Official website

Nondenominational Christian schools in Western Australia
Educational institutions established in 1977
1977 establishments in Australia